Phoenix Football Club is a football club based in Brinsworth, Rotherham, South Yorkshire, England.

History
The club originated as Steel, Peech and Tozer, the works team of the steel making firm. In 1950 they beat Maltby Main to reach the 1st qualifying round of the FA Cup, where they were beaten 0–9 by Norton Woodseats. The club was renamed Phoenix in 1971, by which time they were members of the Sheffield & Hallamshire County Senior League and in 1992 they won the Premier Division title.

In 1995 they merged with fellow S&HCSL outfit Ash House to form Ash House Phoenix, but just two years later the new club dissolved and Phoenix was reformed that year. They won their second S&HCSL title in 1998, but fell into difficulties in 2007, later joining the Central Midlands League.

Season-by-season record

Ground
The club plays at the Phoenix Sports & Social Club, on Pavilion Lane, Brinsworth, postcode S60 5PA.

Honours

League
Sheffield and Hallamshire County Senior League Premier Division
Champions: 1991–92, 1997–98

Cup
Rotherham Charity Cup
Winners: 1962–63, 1996–97, 2009–10
Runners-up: 1948–49

Rotherham Association cup

Winners: 2009-10

Runners-up: 2010 -11

Central Midlands Chairman's Plate Cup

Winners: 2020-21

Records
Best FA Cup performance: 1st Qualifying Round, 1948–49, 1950–51

References

External links

Twitter page

Football clubs in South Yorkshire
Football clubs in England
Sheffield & Hallamshire County FA members
Hatchard League
Sheffield Association League
Sheffield & Hallamshire County Senior Football League
Central Midlands Football League
Works association football teams in England